The 1941 New Mexico Lobos football team represented the University of New Mexico in the Border Conference during the 1941 college football season.  In their fifth and final season under head coach Ted Shipkey, the Lobos compiled a 5–4–1 record (3–2–1 against Border opponents), finished fifth in the conference, and were outscored by opponents by a total of 135 to 116.

Guard William Thompson was selected by the conference coaches as a second-team player on the 1941 All-Border Conference football team.

One week after the season ended, the United States entered World War II following the Attack on Pearl Harbor. In May 1942, New Mexico's head football coach, Ted Shipkey, was commissioned as a captain in the Army Air Corps and ordered to report to Albuquerque Air Base for assignment. In his five seasons at New Mexico, Shipkey compiled a 26–17–2 record.

Schedule

References

New Mexico
New Mexico Lobos football seasons
New Mexico Lobos football